14436 Morishita, provisional designation , is a stony background asteroid and exceptionally slow rotator from the middle region of the asteroid belt, approximately 5 kilometers in diameter.

It was discovered on 23 March 1992, by Japanese astronomers Kin Endate and Kazuro Watanabe at Kitami Observatory in Japan, and named after amateur astronomer Yoko Morishita.

Orbit and classification 

Morishita is a S-type asteroid that orbits the Sun in the central main-belt at a distance of 2.0–3.2 AU once every 4 years and 2 months (1,508 days). Its orbit has an eccentricity of 0.22 and an inclination of 2° with respect to the ecliptic. As no precoveries were taken, and no prior identifications were made, the body's observation arc begins with its official discovery observation.

Photometry 

In October 2010, a rotational lightcurve of Morishita was obtained from photometric observations at the Palomar Transient Factory in California. Lightcurve analysis gave an exceptionally long rotation period of 972.8 hours with a brightness amplitude of 0.82 magnitude, indicative for a non-spheroidal shape.

Diameter and albedo 

According to the survey carried out by NASA's Wide-field Infrared Survey Explorer with its subsequent NEOWISE mission, Morishita measures 5.656 kilometers in diameter and its surface has an albedo of 0.152, while the Collaborative Asteroid Lightcurve Link assumes a standard albedo for stony asteroids of 0.20 and calculates a shorter diameter of 3.49 kilometers.

Naming 

This minor planet was named for Yoko Morishita (b. 1947), amateur astronomer and supporter of the Astronomical Society of Shikoku, where she has made many contributions to further the spread of astronomical awareness. The approved naming citation was published by the Minor Planet Center on 25 April 2013.

References

External links 
 Asteroid Lightcurve Database (LCDB), query form (info )
 Dictionary of Minor Planet Names, Google books
 Asteroids and comets rotation curves, CdR – Observatoire de Genève, Raoul Behrend
 Discovery Circumstances: Numbered Minor Planets (10001)-(15000) – Minor Planet Center
 
 

014436
Discoveries by Kin Endate
Discoveries by Kazuro Watanabe
Named minor planets
014436
19920323